Local elections were held in Cebu City on May 9, 2016, within the Philippine general election. Registered voters of the city elected candidates for the following elective local posts: mayor, vice mayor, district representative, and eight councilors at-large for each district. There are two legislative districts in the city.

Tomas Osmeña, who previously served as Mayor of Cebu City, defeated incumbent Michael Rama who was seeking for his third and last term by a margin of 33,894 votes.

Mayoralty and vice mayoralty elections

Mayor
Michael Rama ran for his third and last term as the Mayor of Cebu City but was defeated by former Mayor Tomas Osmeña, who ran against Rama for the second time since losing to him in the 2013 elections.

Vice Mayor
Edgardo Labella ran for his second term as the Vice Mayor of Cebu City and defeated incumbent Cebu City Councilor for the North District Nestor Archival.

District representatives

1st District
Raul del Mar ran for his second term, and won.

2nd District
Rodrigo Abellanosa ran for his second term, and won.

City Council
Incumbents are expressed in italics. Number indicates the ballot number assigned for the candidates by the Commission on Elections (COMELEC).

By ticket

Liberal Party/Bando Osmeña-Pundok Kauswagan

United Nationalist Alliance/Barug Team Rama

Nacionalista Party

Kilusang Bagong Lipunan

Philippine Green Republican Party

Independents

By district

1st District
Key: Italicized: incumbent

 

| colspan="7" style="background:black;"|

2nd District
Key: Italicized: incumbent

| colspan="16" style="background:black;"|

References

2016 Philippine local elections
Elections in Cebu City